Michala Elizabeth Laurinda Banas (born 14 November 1978) is a New Zealand television actress and singer.

Life and career
Born in Wellington, New Zealand into a family of German descent, she starred in her first advert at only 18 months of age.

Her debut film performance was when she was five years old, in the New Zealand film Dangerous Orphans. Her Australian debut television performance was as Louisa in the miniseries Mirror, Mirror in 1995.

From 2001-03, Banas played main character Marissa Taylor in the Seven Network drama Always Greener. 

In 2002, she had a small role in the film adaptation Scooby-Doo.

Banas is an accomplished singer, and in 2003 released a single, "Kissin' The Wind", which made the top 30 on the Australian Recording Industry Association singles chart.

In 2004, Banas joined the cast of McLeod's Daughters as the character Kate Manfredi, the best friend of Jodi Fountain McLeod. She played Kate from episodes 88 to 170, when she took a short break to later return in episode 177. It was announced in 2007 that she would leave McLeod's Daughters in its final season. Banas' last episode was aired in early December 2008.

From 11 November 2008, Banas appeared in the role of Libby Kennedy on the Australian soap opera Neighbours for a five-week period after Kym Valentine was forced to take a temporary break due to illness.

In 2009, Banas filled in for Fox FM's Jo Stanley on The Matt and Jo Show while Stanley was on maternity leave. That same year saw her star in the Australian national tour of the Broadway musical, Avenue Q, playing the roles of "Kate Monster" and "Lucy the Slut". Banas was one of three celebrity faces for Proactiv Solution in Australia and New Zealand.

Banas had a guest role as Tiffany Turner on the drama series Winners & Losers, and a supporting role on ABC3 teen drama Nowhere Boys as Phoebe. In 2013, Banas starred in the ABC comedy series Upper Middle Bogan as Amber Wheeler. The series has run for three seasons.

Filmography

Discography

Singles

References

External links
 
 Michala Banas management

1978 births
Living people
Helpmann Award winners
Actresses from Wellington City
New Zealand television actresses
New Zealand people of German descent
21st-century New Zealand women singers